Hari River may refer to:

 Hari River (Afghanistan), one of the three major rivers of Afghanistan
 Batang Hari River, the longest river in Sumatra, Indonesia